Bobrowice  is a village in Krosno Odrzańskie County, in Lubusz Voivodeship, western Poland. It is the seat of the gmina (administrative district) called Gmina Bobrowice.

Geography
The village has a population of 884.

History
Together with the neighbouring town of Krosno, the area of Bobrowice from the 12th century on was part of the Duchy of Silesia, located near the western border with the Imperial March of Lusatia (later Lower Lusatia).

Part of the Silesian Duchy of Głogów under the Piast duke Konrad I from 1251 on, the settlement in 1476 belonged to the inheritance of Barbara of Brandenburg, widow of the last Głogów duke Henry XI, and therefore claimed by her father Elector Albert Achilles of Brandenburg. The acquisition was officially acknowledged by Ferdinand I of Habsburg in his capacity as Bohemian king in 1538, whereafter Bobrowice was incorporated into the Neumark district of Brandenburg.

Notable residents
 Helmut Adam (1916–1942) Wehrmacht officer

References

Villages in Krosno Odrzańskie County